Wingrove & Rogers Ltd of Kirkby, Liverpool, England, was formed in 1919 by Major Charles William Wingrove M.C. (1889-1976) and William Rogers (b1891) to manufacture control gear for electric vehicles. In the 1920s they diversified into variable capacitors, the components essential for tuning in the front end of radio receivers which they continued through the second world war during which they supplied the armed forces. In 1926 they amalgamated with British Electric Vehicles Ltd, and moved the electric vehicle production from Southport to Liverpool where they made vehicles such as electrically motorised trolleys and electric locomotives (mainly narrow gauge), largely for use in factories, mines, and by tunnelling contractors.

The radio component part of the business was run under a subsidiary, Polar Ltd, formed in 1925. In mid-1928 they opened the Polar Works and they used the "Polar" trademark for the variable capacitors. The Polar business was sold off to Jackson Brothers (London) Ltd of Croydon at the end of 1980, having lost money in 8 of the previous 9 years. The contents of the Polar Works were auctioned on 12th February 1981.

Wingrove & Rogers sold their electric vehicle and locomotive business to Pikrose & Co Ltd in 1989, and then the company was put into voluntary liquidation. Pikrose were a long established firm founded by Austin Hopkinson in the 1900s making equipment for the mining industry at their Delta works in Audenshaw, Manchester, and they continued the manufacture of the battery electric locomotives with surviving examples known from 1992 and 1993 - one is preserved at the Apedale Valley Light Railway. In 2006 Pikrose sold the B.E.V. business to Serminsa (of Peru) who have continued production of the locomotives.

Products 
William Rogers patented a controller for electric vehicles in June 1919, and about the same time he teamed up with Charles William Wingrove to form Wingrove & Rogers Ltd. Their company manufactured the controller used on the electric vehicles manufactured by British Electric Vehicles of Southport. 

In 1922 the company started patenting items associated with radio tuning such as variable condensers, and this became an important part of the business, with several related patents until the advent of WW2, and production for the armed forces during the war. 

After amalgamating with British Electric Vehicles in 1926 they produced electrically powered factory trolleys, and narrow gauge railway locomotives, used in factories and mines. In 1929 it was also reported that they marketed electric road vehicles made by Victor Electrics Ltd of Southport. By the 1960s their range of products had extended to include fork lift trucks and pallet trucks.

The locomotive type designations were based on weight :
1.5ton Types WR5 and WR5L
2 Ton Type WR8
3-3.5 Ton Type WR18
5 Ton Type W527
7-8 Ton Type W128

Preserved Vehicles 
These simple battery locomotives were some of the last narrow gauge locomotives to be made, and some are still in industrial use. Their preservation largely came after the steam and internal combustion locomotives had been preserved with the realisation that they are also a part of the same story and need to be represented in collections.

References 

Locomotive manufacturers of the United Kingdom
Manufacturing companies of England
Companies based in Merseyside
Defunct companies of England
1926 establishments in England
1990s disestablishments in England
History of radio